Ryan MacMurchy (born April 27, 1983) is a Canadian former professional ice hockey right winger who last played for EHC Kloten of the Swiss League (SL). He was drafted by the St. Louis Blues in the 9th round of the 2002 NHL Entry Draft, but has yet to play in the NHL.

Playing career 
MacMurchy played collegiate hockey with the University of Wisconsin in the Western Collegiate Hockey Association. MacMurchy began his professional career within the Blues organization with AHL affiliate, the Peoria Rivermen.

Unable to crack the NHL ranks, on August 5, 2011, MacMurchy embarked upon a European career, signing with Norwegian club, the Stavanger Oilers of the GET-ligaen. As the league's top point scorer in the 2011–12 regular season (37 goals and 76 points in 44 games), Ryan led Oilers to the team's first ever regular season championship. With points in every home game of the regular season and a 13-game pointstreak(home and away games), he shattered several team records. In a game against Frisk Tigers on December 30, 2011, Ryan scored 6 points (3 goals + 3 assists) and tied the team record for most points in one game.

The Oilers finished the regular season with a record breaking 112 points and earned the No. 1 seed heading into the playoffs. Stavanger swept both  Rosenborg IHK (Quarter-final) and Lillehammer IK (Semi-final) in four games, earning the club's third consecutive playoff final appearance. On April 13, 2012, the Oilers won game six of the finals and became Norwegian Champions. Ryan, with 9 goals and 21 points, finished 3rd on the league leader board for the playoffs.

On April 9, 2012, the Norwegian Ice Hockey Association awarded Ryan, The Golden Helmet, an award given to the league's top point scorer. He was also appointed the Right Wing on the Team of the Year, a fictional team put together after votes from all the players in the league, alongside Stavanger Oilers Defenceman Tim Kunes.

As a free agent on April 22, 2012, Ryan left Norway and signed a contract with HC Red Ice of the Swiss National League B. In scoring 30 points in just 24 games, on January 15, 2013, he signed a contract until the end of season with EHC Biel of the Swiss National League A.

After parts of two seasons with Biel, MacMurchy signed in the German DEL, agreeing to a one-year deal with ERC Ingolstadt on June 27, 2014. In the 2014–15 season, MacMurchy helped the club return to the Championship finals, however was injured during the post-season. In 42 regular season games he contributed with 52 points, placing second on the team.

On June 10, 2015, MacMurchy signed a two-year deal with fellow DEL competitors, Adler Mannheim.

After four seasons in the DEL, MacMurchy left as a free agent to return to Switzerland, agreeing to a one-year deal with EHC Kloten of the Swiss League on July 6, 2018.

Career statistics

References

External links

1983 births
Abbotsford Heat players
Adler Mannheim players
Alaska Aces (ECHL) players
EHC Biel players
ERC Ingolstadt players
Canadian ice hockey right wingers
HC Red Ice players
Ice hockey people from Saskatchewan
Living people
Sportspeople from Regina, Saskatchewan
Peoria Rivermen (AHL) players
Springfield Falcons players
St. Louis Blues draft picks
Stavanger Oilers players
Stockton Thunder players
Victoria Salmon Kings players
Wisconsin Badgers men's ice hockey players
Canadian expatriate ice hockey players in Norway
Canadian expatriate ice hockey players in Germany
Canadian expatriate ice hockey players in Switzerland